Fu Tung Estate is a public housing estate in Tung Chung, Lantau Island, New Territories, Hong Kong near MTR Tung Chung station. Built on the reclaimed land of North Lantau New Town Phase 1 project, it is the first public housing estate in Tung Chung and consists of three residential buildings completed in 1997.

Yu Tung Court is a Home Ownership Scheme court in Tung Chung, near Fu Tung Estate and Tung Chung station. Built on the reclaimed land of North Lantau New Town Phase 1 project, it has five residential buildings completed in 1997.

Houses

Fu Tung Estate

Yu Tung Court

Demographics
According to the 2016 by-census, Fu Tung Estate had a population of 5,295 while Yu Tung Court had a population of 6,655. Altogether the population amounts to 11,950.

Politics
Fu Tung Estate and Yu Tung Court are located in Tung Chung South constituency of the Islands District Council. It is currently represented by Sheep Wong Chun-yeung, who was elected in the 2019 elections.

See also

Public housing estates on Lantau Island

References

Public housing estates in Hong Kong
Tung Chung